Mody Kidon is an Israeli businessman, with real estate interests both in Israel and abroad. He is the chairman of the Israel Advertising Federation and a senior business manager for Gitam Image Promotion Systems, a private holdings company.

Personal life and family 
Born September 17, 1954, Kidon served as a pilot in the Israeli Air Force, and continued to fly until the age of 45 as a reserve pilot. He retired with the rank of major. Kidon achieved a baccalaureate in economics from Tel Aviv University, and attended Harvard Business School’s six-week Advanced Management Program (AMP). He is married to  Sharon Kidon, a journalist and television personality. They are the parents of two daughters, he also has two children from previous marriage.

Business career

Gitam BBDO
In 1981, Kidon joined the advertising firm Gitam Image Systems, founded by his father Yochanan Goldberg-Kidon (Dovz’e) (1921–1986), and by his cousin Moshe Theumim (born 1945). BBDO Omnicom purchased 49% of Gitam in 1994, turning Gitam BBDO into the first Israeli advertising agency with a global partnership.
In 1997, Gitam made history by producing the first advertisement in space, which was noted in the Guinness Book of Records. Mody Kidon was appointed in 2004 as Chief Business Officer of the BBDO Group in Israel and chairman of the TMF media company. In 2011, Gitam was ranked as the leading agency by the Calcalist Financial Paper.

Real-Estate
Kidon's initial foray into real-estate investing began in 1995 as a founding partner of Vitania, with acquisitions in Israel focusing on office buildings mainly in the Ramat Hachayal (Tel-Aviv) and Herzliya 'High-Tech' Business Parks.

Alto Real Estate Funds
In 2010, Kidon as founder and chairman, set up ALTO Real Estate Funds. Alto launched a series of closed end investment funds, building up portfolios of commercial real-estate assets in the U.S. and Europe.
In September 2015, the company completed fundraising for its second fund, Alto Fund II, for a total of $138 million from institutional and private investors. As of August 2016, Alto has invested in more than 50 properties, totaling 11 million sq.f. and with a market value estimated at $1 billion. Alto maintains headquarters in Manhattan, with regional offices in Dallas and Tel Aviv.

References

1954 births
Living people
Israeli Jews
Israeli businesspeople
Tel Aviv University alumni
Israeli Air Force personnel
Israeli aviators